This is the list of Estonian-language plays. The list is incomplete.

See also
 List of Estonian musicals

References

External links
 Database of plays, teater.ee

 
Estonia
plays